Ri Kum-dong (born 18 September 1981) is a North Korean former footballer. He represented North Korea on at least six occasions between 2003 and 2004.

Career statistics

International

References

1981 births
Living people
North Korean footballers
North Korea international footballers
Association football forwards